Felipe Alfonso Criado (born 14 April 1993) is a Spanish footballer who plays for Mérida AD as a right-back.

Club career
Born in Valladolid, Castile and León, Alfonso was a youth product at local club Real Valladolid, making his senior debut with the B side and going on to spend two seasons in the Tercera División with them. On 22 October 2011 he made his debut with the first team, starting and playing 80 minutes in a 2–1 Segunda División home win against CD Numancia.

Alfonso joined Villarreal CF B of Segunda División B on 22 June 2012. On 25 August 2015, having established himself as a starter and captain of the reserves, he suffered a severe knee injury which sidelined him for the entire season.

On 9 July 2017, Alfonso returned to the second tier after signing a contract with AD Alcorcón. On 5 July 2019, he moved to Hércules CF in the third division.

Alfonso continued competing in the lower leagues subsequently, having two spells at Mérida AD.

References

External links
Villarreal official profile 

1993 births
Living people
Spanish footballers
Footballers from Valladolid
Association football defenders
Segunda División players
Segunda División B players
Tercera División players
Primera Federación players
Segunda Federación players
Real Valladolid Promesas players
Real Valladolid players
Villarreal CF B players
AD Alcorcón footballers
Hércules CF players
Mérida AD players
Spain youth international footballers